The 2011 Philippine Basketball Association (PBA) rookie draft was an event at which teams drafted players from the amateur ranks. The event was held at Robinson's Place Ermita in Manila on August 28, 2011. Players who applied for the draft underwent a rookie camp that lasted a week.

Draft lottery
The lottery was held on August 6, 2011, before the start of the 2011 PBA Governors Cup Finals at the Smart Araneta Coliseum in Quezon City. The Powerade Tigers beat the statistical odds by winning the first overall pick against the Air21 Express (renamed as Barako Bull Energy starting the 2011-12 season). From this year on, as opposed in having the draft last two rounds as what was done from 2005 to 2010, the league allowed the draft to continue until all teams have passed.

Draft

1st round

2nd round

3rd round

Note: Powerade, Barako Bull, Meralco, Rain or Shine, B-Meg, Alaska, Barangay Ginebra and Talk 'N Text passed in this round.

4th round

Note: Shopinas.com passed in this round.

Notes
  Given by the PBA board to the Shopinas.com Clickers as an incentive for purchasing the old Barako Bull franchise.

Trades involving draft picks

Pre-draft trades
Prior to the day of the draft, the following trades were made and resulted in exchanges of draft picks between the teams.
  On January 20, 2011, in a three-team trade, Rain or Shine acquired a first round pick, a 2013 first round pick, Ronjay Buenafe and Ronnie Matias from Barako Bull (as Air21) and Beau Belga from Meralco, the Express acquired Reed Juntilla, a second round pick and a 2013 second round pick from the Bolts, and the Bolts acquired Sol Mercado and Paolo Bugia from the Elasto Painters and Erick Rodriguez from the Express.
  On September 16, 2010, Powerade acquired a first round pick and Eddie Laure in exchange for Larry Rodriguez.
  On August 26, 2011, B-Meg re-acquired a first round pick from Shopinas in exchange for two future second round draft picks. Previously, the Red Bull Barako acquired the pick on October 31, 2008, from B-Meg (as Purefoods) in exchange for Rich Alvarez. Red Bull's franchise was sold to Shopinas in the 2011 off-season. 
  On August 28, 2011, in a three-team trade, Talk 'N Text acquired Bam Gamalinda and Shawn Weinstein from Meralco, the Bolts acquired Mark Yee from the Tropang Texters and a first round pick and Mark Macapagal from Powerade, and the Tigers acquired Chris Timberlake and Ogie Menor from Meralco, and a second round pick from Talk 'N Text. Previously, the pick was acquired by Talk 'N Text from the Barako Bull Energy Boosters before its disbandment.
 
 
 
 
  On August 29, 2010, the Alaska Aces acquired a second draft pick in exchange for the draft rights to RJ Jazul.
 
  On September 4, 2010, Ginebra acquired a second round pick from the Barako Bull Energy Boosters in exchange for Sunday Salvacion.
  On September 3, 2010, Ginebra acquired a second round pick from Air21 in exchange for Billy Mamaril.

Draft-day trades
   The Petron Blaze Boosters acquired the draft rights to 3rd pick Chris Lutz, Dondon Hontiveros and Carlo Sharma from Barako Bull in exchange for Mick Pennisi, Sunday Salvacion, future draft picks and Petron's 8th pick.
  The Meralco Bolts acquired the draft rights to 17th pick Gilbert Bulawan from Alaska Aces in exchange for a 2014 second round draft pick.

Undrafted players

References

External links
 PBA.ph

Philippine Basketball Association draft
Draft